Ferulic acid is a hydroxycinnamic acid, an organic compound with the formula (CH3O)HOC6H3CH=CHCO2H.  The name is derived from the genus Ferula, referring to the giant fennel (Ferula communis). Classified as a phenolic phytochemical, ferulic acid is an amber colored solid.  Esters of ferulic acid are found in plant cell walls, covalently bonded to hemicellulose such as arabinoxylans.

Occurrence in nature 
As a building block of lignocelluloses, such as pectin and lignin, ferulic acid is ubiquitous in the plant kingdom, including a number of vegetable sources.  It occurs in particularly high concentrations in popcorn and bamboo shoots. It is a major metabolite of chlorogenic acids in humans along with caffeic and isoferulic acid, and is absorbed in the small intestine, whereas other metabolites such as dihydroferulic acid, feruloylglycine and dihydroferulic acid sulfate are produced from chlorogenic acid in the large intestine by the action of gut flora.

In cereals, ferulic acid is localized in the bran – the hard outer layer of grain. In wheat, phenolic compounds are mainly found in the form of insoluble bound ferulic acid and may be relevant to resistance to wheat fungal diseases.  The highest known concentration of ferulic acid glucoside has been found in flaxseed. It is also found in barley grain.

Asterid eudicot plants can also produce ferulic acid. The tea brewed from the leaves of yacón (Smallanthus sonchifolius), a plant traditionally grown in the northern and central Andes, contains quantities of ferulic acid. In legumes, the white bean variety navy bean is the richest source of ferulic acid among the common bean (Phaseolus vulgaris) varieties. It is also found in horse grams (Macrotyloma uniflorum).

Although there are many sources of ferulic acid in nature, its  bioavailability depends on the form in which it is present: free ferulic acid has limited solubility in water, and hence poor bioavailability. In wheat grain, ferulic acid is found bound to cell wall polysaccharides, allowing it to be released and absorbed in the small intestine.

In herbal medicines
Ferulic acid has been identified in Chinese medicine herbs such as Angelica sinensis (female ginseng), Cimicifuga heracleifolia and Ligusticum chuangxiong. It is also found in the tea brewed from the European centaury (Centaurium erythraea), a plant used as a medical herb in many parts of Europe.

In processed foods 
Cooked sweetcorn releases increased levels of ferulic acid. As plant sterol esters, this compound is naturally found in rice bran oil, a popular cooking oil in several Asian countries.

Ferulic acid glucoside can be found in commercial breads containing flaxseed. Rye bread contains ferulic acid dehydrodimers.

Metabolism

Biosynthesis 
Ferulic acid is biosynthesized in plants from caffeic acid by the action of the enzyme caffeate O-methyltransferase. 

In a proposed ferulic acid biosynthetic pathway for Escherichia coli, L-tyrosine is converted to 4-coumaric acid by tyrosine ammonia lyase, which is converted to caffeic acid by Sam5, which is then converted to ferulic acid by caffeic acid methyltransferase.

Ferulic acid, together with dihydroferulic acid, is a component of lignocellulose, serving to crosslink the lignin and polysaccharides, thereby conferring rigidity to the cell walls.

It is an intermediate in the synthesis of monolignols, the monomers of lignin, and is also used for the synthesis of lignans.

Biodegradation 
Ferulic acid is converted by certain strains of yeast, notably strains used in brewing of wheat beers, such as Saccharomyces delbrueckii (Torulaspora delbrueckii), to 4-vinyl guaiacol (2-methoxy-4-vinylphenol) which gives beers such as Weissbier and Wit their distinctive clove-like flavour. Saccharomyces cerevisiae (dry baker's yeast) and Pseudomonas fluorescens are also able to convert trans-ferulic acid into 2-methoxy-4-vinylphenol. In P. fluorescens, a ferulic acid decarboxylase has been isolated.

Ecology 
Ferulic acid is one of the compounds that initiate the vir (virulence) region of Agrobacterium tumefaciens, inducing it to infect plant cells.

Extraction 
It can be extracted from wheat bran and maize bran using concentrated alkali.

See also 
 Caffeic acid
 Coumaric acid
 Diferulic acids
 Eugenol
 Isoferulic acid, an isomer of ferulic acid

References 

Phenol antioxidants
O-methylated hydroxycinnamic acids
Bitter-masking compounds
Vinylogous carboxylic acids